Neoaviola is a monotypic genus of Australian dwarf sheet spiders containing the single species, Neoaviola insolens. It was first described by Arthur Gardiner Butler in 1929, and has only been found in Australia. It might be a synonym for Rinawa.

References

Hahniidae
Monotypic Araneomorphae genera
Spiders of Australia
Taxa named by Arthur Gardiner Butler